Alan Paul Busenitz (born August 22, 1990) is an American professional baseball pitcher in the Cincinnati Reds organization. He previously played in Major League Baseball (MLB) for the Minnesota Twins and in the Nippon Professional Baseball (NPB) for the Tohoku Rakuten Golden Eagles.

Career

Los Angeles Angels
Busenitz attended Athens Christian School in Athens, Georgia, and Kennesaw State University, where he played college baseball for the Kennesaw State Owls. The Los Angeles Angels selected him in the 25th round of the 2013 MLB draft. He made his professional debut with the rookie ball Orem Owlz, logging a 5–2 record and 2.33 ERA in 21 appearances. The next year, Busenitz played for the Single-A Burlington Bees, pitching to a 4–5 record and 1.94 ERA in 49 games. In 2015, the Angels tried to use Busenitz as a starting pitcher with the Double-A Arkansas Travelers, but returned to using him as a relief pitcher with the High-A Inland Empire 66ers after he struggled to a 6.75 ERA in 16 contests. In 2016, the Angels promoted Busenitz to the Salt Lake Bees of the Class AAA Pacific Coast League. In 10 games for Salt Lake, Busenitz struggled to a 7.62 ERA, and also logged a 1.93 ERA in 24 appearances for Arkansas.

Minnesota Twins
On August 1, 2016, The Angels traded Busenitz to the Minnesota Twins alongside Hector Santiago in exchange for Alex Meyer and Ricky Nolasco. Busenitz finished the year with the Rochester Red Wings of the Triple-A International League and the Double-A Chattanooga Lookouts, posting a 2–0 record with 10 strikeouts.

Busenitz began the 2017 season with Rochester, and pitched to a 1.25 earned run average in his first  innings pitched of the season. On June 17, 2017, he was selected to the 40-man roster and promoted to the major leagues for the first time. He made his MLB debut that day, pitching 2.0 innings of 1-run ball against the Cleveland Indians. He finished his rookie season with a neat 1.99 ERA in 31.2 innings pitched across 28 contests. In 2018, Busenitz could not replicate his success from the previous year, struggling to a 4–1 record and 7.82 ERA in 23 major league appearances. He was granted his unconditional release on November 20, 2018, so he could sign with a team in Nippon Professional Baseball.

Tohoku Rakuten Golden Eagles
On November 20, 2018, Busenitz signed with the Tohoku Rakuten Golden Eagles of Japan's Nippon Professional Baseball (NPB). In his first NPB season, Busenitz logged a 4–3 record and stellar 1.94 ERA in 54 appearances for Rakuten. On December 3, 2019, Busenitz signed a 1-year extension to remain with the Eagles. By 2022, Busenitz had pitched in 165 games for the Eagles, recording a 9–8 record and 2.83 ERA in 155.2 innings pitched.

Cincinnati Reds
On December 27, 2022, Busenitz signed a minor league contract with an invitation to spring training with the Cincinnati Reds.

References

External links

1990 births
Living people
American expatriate baseball players in Japan
Arkansas Travelers players
Baseball players from Georgia (U.S. state)
Burlington Bees players
Chattanooga Lookouts players
Georgia Perimeter Jaguars baseball players
Inland Empire 66ers of San Bernardino players
Kennesaw State Owls baseball players
Major League Baseball pitchers
Mesa Solar Sox players
Minnesota Twins players
Nippon Professional Baseball pitchers
Orem Owlz players
People from Watkinsville, Georgia
Rochester Red Wings players
Salt Lake Bees players
Tohoku Rakuten Golden Eagles players